Chelnokovka is a rural locality (a village) in Vozdvizhensky Selsoviet, Alsheyevsky District, Bashkortostan, Russia. The population was 67 as of 2010. There are 3 streets.

Geography 
Chelnokovka is located 39 km southwest of Rayevsky (the district's administrative centre) by road. Osorgino is the nearest rural locality.

References 

Rural localities in Alsheyevsky District